Pestenkino is a rural locality (a village) in Kovarditskoye Rural Settlement, Muromsky District, Vladimir Oblast, Russia. The population was 778 as of 2010. There are 8 streets.

Geography 
Pestenkino is located 15 km northwest of Murom (the district's administrative centre) by road. Ramezhki is the nearest rural locality.

References 

Rural localities in Muromsky District
Muromsky Uyezd